Spain politics-related lists
Politics of Madrid